Eugène Marin Labiche (6 May 181522 January 1888) was a French dramatist. He remains famous for his contribution to the vaudeville genre and his passionate and domestic pochads. 

In the 1860s, he reached his peak with a series of successes including Le Voyage de M. Perrichon (1860), La Poudre aux yeux (1861), La Station Champbaudet (1862) and La Cagnotte (1864). He worked with Jacques Offenbach, then director of the Bouffes-Parisiens, to write librettos for operettas and for several comic operas.

His 1851 farce The Italian Straw Hat, written with Marc-Michel, has been adapted many times to stage and screen.

Early life
He was born into a bourgeois family and studied law. At the age of twenty, he contributed a short story to Chérubin magazine, entitled "Les plus belles sont les plus fausses" ("The most beautiful are the most fake/false"). A few others followed, but failed to catch the attention of the public.

Career
Labiche tried his hand at dramatic criticism in the Revue des théâtres and in 1838, wrote and premiered two plays.
The small Théâtre du Pantheon produced, to some popular success, his drama L'Avocat Loubet, while a vaudeville, Monsieur de Coyllin, ou l'homme infiniment poli (written in collaboration with Marc-Michel and performed at the Palais Royal) introduced a provincial actor who was to become and to remain a great Parisian favourite, the famous comedian Grassot.

In the same year,  Labiche, still doubtful about his true vocation, published a romance called La Clé des champs.  According to Léon Halévy, Labiche's publisher went bankrupt soon after the novel was out: "A lucky misadventure, for this timely warning of Destiny sent him back to the stage, where a career of success was awaiting him." There was yet another obstacle in the way. When he married, Labiche solemnly promised his wife's parents that he would renounce a profession then considered incompatible with moral regularity and domestic happiness. A year later, his wife released him from his vow, and Labiche recalled the incident when he dedicated the first edition of his complete works to her.

In conjunction with Charles Varin, Marc-Michel, Louis François Clairville, Philippe François Dumanoir, and others, he contributed comic plays interspersed with couplets to various Paris theatres.  He was considered a successful but undistinguished vaudevillist, until he paired with Marc-Michel to create the five-act farce, Un Chapeau de paille d'Italie (The Italian Straw Hat), which turned out to be a major success upon its opening in August 1851. It is an accomplished specimen of the French imbroglio-style play, in which someone is in search of something, but does not find it till five minutes before the curtain falls.  For the next twenty-five years, he continued to write successful comedies and vaudevilles, all basically constructed on the same plan and containing a dose of comic observation and good sense.
"Of all the subjects," he said, "which offered themselves to me, I have selected the bourgeois. Essentially mediocre in his vices and in his virtues, he stands half-way between the hero and the scoundrel, between the saint and the profligate."

During the second period of his career Labiche collaborated with Alfred Delacour, Adolphe Choler, and others. Emile Augier said: "The distinctive qualities which secured a lasting vogue for the plays of Labiche are to be found in all the comedies written by him with different collaborators, and are conspicuously absent from those which they wrote without him."  Even more important was his professional relationship with actor Jean Marie Geoffroy, who specialized in Labiche's pompous and fussy bourgeois characters.  Many of Labiche's roles were written specifically for Geoffroy.  Célimare le bien-aimé (1863), Le Voyage de M. Perrichon (1860), La Grammaire, Un Pied dans le crime, La Cagnotte (1864), were some of Labiche's most important plays.

Retirement and death
In 1877, he ended his connection with the stage, and retired to his rural property in Sologne. There, he devoted his energies to supervising agricultural work and to reclaiming land and marshes. His lifelong friend, Émile Augier, visited him there, and strongly advised Labiche to publish a collected and revised edition of his works. Though Labiche was initially reluctant, he issued, during 1878 and 1879, his comic plays in ten volumes, which were enthusiastically received.  Many people had assumed that Labiche's plays owed their popularity to the actors who had appeared in them, but, upon reading the plays, they realized that their success was due to the writing itself, with its humor and skilled characterization.  Due to this re-evaluation of Labiche's writing, he was elected to the Académie française in 1880.

Labiche died in Paris and was buried in the Cimetière de Montmartre.

Appreciation
Some admirers have considered Labiche the equal of Molière; his plays are more complex and less coarse than many other examples of French farce.  Love is practically absent from his theatre. In none of his plays did he ever venture into the depths of feminine psychology, and womankind is only represented by pretentious old maids and silly young ladies. He ridiculed marriage, but in a friendly and good-natured manner that always left a door open to repentance and timely amendment.

Plays 
1840: Deux Papas Très-bien, ou La Grammaire de Chicard
1844: Le Major Cravachon
1846: Frisette
1848: Le Club Champenois
1848: Un Jeune Homme Pressé
1850: Embrassons-nous, Folleville!
1850: La Fille Bien Gardée
1850: Un garçon de chez Véry
1851: The Italian Straw Hat (Un chapeau de paille d'Italie)
1852: Maman Sabouleux
1852: Edgar et sa Bonne
1852: Mon Isménie!
1852: Un Monsieur qui Prend la Mouche
1852: Les Suites d'un Premier Lit
1853: La Chasse aux Corbeaux
1854: Les Marquises de la fourchette
1855: La Perle de la Canebière
1856: Si Jamais je te pince...!
1857: L'Affaire de la rue de Lourcine
1857: Les Noces de Bouchencœur
1858: L'Avare en gants jaunes
1858: Un Monsieur qui Brûlé une dame
1858: Deux Merles Blancs
1858: Le Clou aux Maris
1859: Les Petites Mans
1859: Le Baron de Fourchevif
1860: Les Deux Timides
1860: Un Gros Mot
1860: J'Invite le Colonel!
1860: La Sensitive
1860: Le Voyage de monsieur Perrichon
1861: 
1861: Les Vivacités du Capitaine Tic
1861: J'ai Compromis ma femme
1862: Les Petits Oiseaux
1862: La Station Champbaudet
1862: Les 37 Sous de Monsieur Montaudoiun 
1862: Le première pas
1863: La Commode de Victorine
1863: Célimar: Le Bien-Aimé
1864: La Cagnotte
1864: Moi
1864: Un Mari qui lance sa femme
1864: Le Point de Mire
1865: Le Voyage en Chine
1866: Un Pied Dans le Crime
1867: La Grammaire
1867: La Main Leste
1868: Le Petit Voyage
1869: Le Choix d'un Gendre (un pochade en un acte)
1870: Le Plus Heureux des Trois
1872: Doit-on le dire?
1873: 29 Degrés à l'Ombre
1875: Les Trente Millions de Gladiator
1875: Le Cachemire X. B. T.
1876: Le Prix Martin
1876: La Cigale chez les fourmis

Filmography 
L'Affaire de la rue de Lourcine, directed by Henri Diamant-Berger (France, 1923, based on the play L'Affaire de la rue de Lourcine), which starred Maurice Chevalier.
La Fille bien gardée, directed by Louis Feuillade (France, 1924, based on the play La Fille bien gardée) 
The Italian Straw Hat, directed by René Clair (France, 1928, based on the play The Italian Straw Hat) 
Two Timid Souls, directed by René Clair (France, 1928, based on the play Les Deux Timides) 
L'Affaire de la rue de Lourcine, directed by Marcel Dumont (France, 1932, short film, based on the play L'Affaire de la rue de Lourcine) 
Le Voyage de monsieur Perrichon, directed by Jean Tarride (France, 1934, based on the play Le Voyage de monsieur Perrichon) 
The Leghorn Hat, directed by Wolfgang Liebeneiner (Germany, 1939, based on the play The Italian Straw Hat) 
, directed by René Pujol (France, 1939, based on the play Maman Sabouleux) 
Un chapeau de paille d'Italie, directed by Maurice Cammage (France, 1941, based on the play The Italian Straw Hat) 
Two Timid Souls, directed by Yves Allégret (France, 1943, based on the play Les Deux Timides) 
, directed by Paolo Moffa (Italy, 1943, based on the play Le Voyage de monsieur Perrichon) 
, directed by Géza von Bolváry (Germany, 1945, based on the play Les Trente Millions de Gladiator), unfinished film
My Niece Susanne, directed by Wolfgang Liebeneiner (West Germany, 1950, based on the play Les Trente Millions de Gladiator)
, directed by Émile Couzinet (France, 1954, based on the play La Cagnotte) 
Matrimonios juveniles, directed by José Díaz Morales (Mexico, 1961, based on the play The Italian Straw Hat)
Straw Hat, directed by Oldřich Lipský (Czechoslovakia, 1971, based on the play The Italian Straw Hat)
The Straw Hat, directed by Leonid Kvinikhidze (The Soviet Union, 1974, based on the play The Italian Straw Hat)

Doit-on le dire ?, directed by Jean-Laurent Cochet (France, 1980, based on the play Doit-on le dire ?, live recording of a performance at the Comédie Française)
The Voyage of Monsieur Perrichon / Путешествие мсье Перришона, directed by Margarita Mikaelyan / Маргари́та Микаэля́н (The Soviet Union, 1986, based on the play Le Voyage de monsieur Perrichon)

References

External links

 
  
 Eugène Labiche at OpenLibrary
 
 

19th-century French dramatists and playwrights
Members of the Académie Française
Burials at Montmartre Cemetery
Lycée Condorcet alumni
Lycée Saint-Louis alumni
19th-century French male writers
Writers from Paris
1815 births
1888 deaths